Miroslav Podrazký (born 18 August 1984) is a retired professional Czech football player and current assistant coach of the U19 team of SK Slavia Prague.

Career

Club career
Podrazký scored his first hat-trick in the Czech 2. Liga for Sokolov in 2010 against Sezimovo Ústí. He finished the 2010–11 Czech 2. Liga as the third-highest scorer with 12 goals, behind Dani Chigou and Miroslav Marković. Having been the top scorer of his club in the 2010–11 season, he joined top flight side FK Dukla Prague in the summer of 2011. At the beginning of the 2013–14 season he moved on to FK Viktoria Žižkov on loan.

Later career
In February 2019, Podrazký left FK Viktoria Žižkov and became a part of the U21 squad/reserve team of SK Slavia Prague. Retiring at the end of 2019, he became assistant coach for the team, under head coach Martin Hyský. For the following season, the duo took charge of the club's U19 team.

References

External links
 
 Guardian Football

1984 births
Living people
Czech footballers
Czech First League players
Bohemians 1905 players
1. FK Příbram players
FK Baník Sokolov players
FK Dukla Prague players
FK Viktoria Žižkov players
FK Slavoj Vyšehrad players
SK Slavia Prague players
Association football midfielders
Association football coaches
SK Slavia Prague non-playing staff